Bhacsaidh or Bhacsaigh (from Old Norse bakkis-ey meaning "peat bank island") is the Scottish Gaelic name of several islands in the Outer Hebrides with similar spelled names in English:

 Vacasay near Eilean Cearstaidh
 Vaccasay near Hermetray
 Vacsay in West Loch Roag